Carlos Alexis Hernández Calderón (born June 8, 1972 in Ciego de Ávila) is a retired male weightlifter from Cuba. He competed for his native country at the 1996 Summer Olympics, finishing in sixth place in the overall-rankings of the men's middle-heavyweight division. He twice won a gold medal at the Pan American Games: 1995 and 1999.

References
 

1972 births
Living people
Cuban male weightlifters
Weightlifters at the 1996 Summer Olympics
Olympic weightlifters of Cuba
People from Ciego de Ávila
Weightlifters at the 1995 Pan American Games
Weightlifters at the 1999 Pan American Games
Pan American Games gold medalists for Cuba
Pan American Games medalists in weightlifting
Medalists at the 1995 Pan American Games
20th-century Cuban people
21st-century Cuban people